The Lesbian Bar Project is a campaign created by Erica Rose and Elina Street to "celebrate, support, and preserve the remaining lesbian bars in the US."  The project launched on October 28, 2020 with a PSA video narrated by Lea DeLaria that announced a 30-day fundraising campaign to support what were thought to be the last 15 lesbian bars left in the country, many of which were financially threatened by the COVID-19 pandemic. A second phase followed in June 2021 in connection with Pride Month, including the release of a short documentary, and a three-part docuseries was released on National Coming Out Day 2022.

History 
Lesbian bars have been in decline across the United States since the 1980s, with more than two hundred having closed due to demographic changes, the wage gap and other city-specific reasons. The Lesbian Bar Project was created by New York City-based filmmakers Elina Street and Erica Rose. In fall 2020 the friends reminisced about one of their last night's out at Brooklyn lesbian bar Ginger's before it shuttered due to the COVID-19 pandemic. They decided to create a fundraiser to provide financial support to lesbian bars across the country. They also noted that the number of bars has dwindled, as there were approximately 200 lesbian bars in the United States in the 1980s and few remained. 

On October 28, 2020, the Project was announced with a YouTube PSA video co-directed by Rose and Street and narrated by Lea DeLaria. The video launched a 30-day fundraising campaign, which featured photographs of the bar interiors and testimonials from the owners. The fundraiser closed on November 26, 2020 and a total of $117,504.50 was raised in that time. By October 2020, they project had raised $260,000.

Virtual events for the project are ongoing, with proceeds going to the Lesbian Bar Project Pool Fund, which are distributed between the 13 participating lesbian bars, as two (Sue Ellen's and Pearl Bar) opted out of receiving funds. Among these virtual events was a November 2020 episode of the podcast Dyking Out, which featured performances from comedians including Lea Delaria, Sydnee Washington, and Cameron Esposito.

Documentaries
In 2020, the directors announced plans to develop a series of documentaries to highlight lesbian bars throughout America, with a longer term goal of international features. In June 2021, for Pride Month, Street and Rose released a short documentary on YouTube titled The Lesbian Bar Project with executive producer Lea Delaria and sponsorship from Jägermeister. On October 11 2022, National Coming Out Day, a three-part docuseries was released on The Roku Channel, with a focus on one bar in each episode of the series.

Producers 
The Lesbian Bar Project is produced in collaboration with Jägermeister through its Save the Night campaign.

Featured bars 

These bars were identified by the Lesbian Bar Project as the last 15 lesbian bars in the United States, although other sources put the number at 21: 

 A League of Her Own (Washington, D.C.)
 Blush & Blu (Denver, Colorado)
 Cubbyhole (New York City)
 Ginger’s (New York City)
 Gossip Grill (San Diego, California)
 Henrietta Hudson (New York City)
 Herz (Mobile, Alabama)
 Lipstick Lounge (Nashville, Tennessee)
 My Sister’s Room (Atlanta, Georgia)
 Pearl Bar (Houston, Texas)
 Slammers (Columbus, Ohio)
 Sue Ellen's (Dallas, Texas)
 Toasted Walnut (Philadelphia, Pennsylvania), which subsequently closed in early 2021
 Walker's Pint (Milwaukee, Wisconsin)
 The Wildrose (Seattle, Washington)
After the Project was launched, the co-directors named lesbian bars they initially overlooked:
 Alibi's (Oklahoma City, Oklahoma)
 Babes of Carytown (Richmond, Virginia)
 Boycott Bar (Phoenix, Arizona)
 Cash Nightclub and Lounge (Phoenix, Arizona)
 Frankie's OKC (Oklahoma City, Oklahoma)
 Wild Side West (San Francisco, California)

References

External links 

 

Lesbian culture
Lesbian organizations in the United States
LGBT history in the United States
Public awareness campaigns
Queer women's culture
Impact of the COVID-19 pandemic on the LGBT community
2020 in LGBT history